Edo Jō Tairan also known as  "Edo castle rebellion is a 1991 Japanese jidaigeki film, directed by Toshio Masuda. The film depicts political conflict during the Tokugawa shogunate.

Plot
The 4th Tokugawa Shogun Tokugawa Ietsuna has no children, so a power dispute occurs over his succession.

Cast
 Hiroki Matsukata : Sakai Tadakiyo
 Yukiyo Toake : Keishōuinn
 Tomokazu Miura : Hotta Masatoshi
 Tokuma Nishioka : Shibozawa
 Masaki Kanda : Tokugawa Tsunashige
 Kenichi Kaneda : Tokugawa Ietsuna
 Shinobu Sakagami : Tokugawa Tsunayoshi
 Kimiko Ikegami : Oei
 Mami Nomura :
 Tappie Shimokawa : Wakabayashi
 Shigeru Kōyama : Tokugawa Mitsusada
 Takeshi Katō : Inaba Masanori
 Sei Hiraizumi : Mera Genzō
 Ken Nishida
 Shun Ōide : Makino Narisada
 Shinjirō Ehara : Ōkubo Tadatomo
 Nobuo Kaneko : Tokugawa Mitsutomo
 Tetsuro Tamba : Tokugawa Mitsukuni

References

External links

Jidaigeki films
Samurai films
1990s Japanese films